Professor Huchuraya is a 1974 Indian Kannada-language comedy-drama film directed by M. R. Vittal and produced by actor Narasimharaju. The story is written by Narendra Babu. Besides Narasimharaju as the protagonist, the film features Vishnuvardhan, Manjula, R. Nagendra Rao and Balakrishna in prominent roles. The film was widely appreciated for its songs and story upon release. The songs tuned by Rajan–Nagendra were huge hits.

Cast 

 Narasimharaju as Prof. Huchuraya
 Vishnuvardhan as Venu
 Manjula as Geetha
 R. Nagendra Rao as Shama Shastry, Huchuraya's uncle
 Balakrishna as Colonel Dhanley, Venu's father
 Dwarakish as Thimma
 Bhargavi Narayan as Meera
 Leelavathi as Indira
 Vaishali Kasaravalli as Kamali
 Rajashankar as a constable
 Lokanath as Dr. Manjesh
 Shyam
 Ranga

Soundtrack 
The music of the film was composed by Rajan–Nagendra. The song "Doora Doora" was received extremely well.

Awards

 Karnataka State Film Award for Best Supporting Actress - Bhargavi Narayan

References

External links 
 

1974 films
1970s Kannada-language films
Indian comedy films
Indian black-and-white films
Films scored by Rajan–Nagendra
1974 comedy films